Shannon E. Chandley (born September 14, 1962) is an American politician from the state of New Hampshire. A Democrat, Chandley represented the 11th district in the New Hampshire Senate from 2018 until 2020, when she was defeated by the seat's former Republican incumbent, Gary Daniels. She defeated Daniels in 2022 and returned to the senate.

Chandley previously served in the New Hampshire House of Representatives for three noncontiguous terms between 2008 and 2010, 2012–2014, and 2016–2018.

References

21st-century American politicians
21st-century American women politicians
Living people
Democratic Party members of the New Hampshire House of Representatives
Democratic Party New Hampshire state senators
Women state legislators in New Hampshire
University of Rhode Island alumni
1962 births